The Prakrits are a group of vernacular Middle Indo-Aryan languages that were used in the Indian subcontinent from around the 3rd century BCE to the 8th century CE. The term Prakrit is usually applied to the middle period of Middle Indo-Aryan languages, excluding earlier inscriptions and Pali. 

Prākṛta literally means "natural", as opposed to saṃskṛta, which literally means "constructed" or "refined". Prakrits were considered the regional spoken (informal) languages of people, and Sanskrit was considered the standardized (formal) language used for literary, official and religious purposes across Indian kingdoms of the subcontinent. Literary registers of Prakrits were also used contemporaneously (predominantly by śramaṇa traditions) alongside Classical Sanskrit of higher social classes.

Etymology

Most native prākrit grammarians identify prākṛta to be named so because they originate in the source language (prakṛti)

 According to the Prākrṭa Prakāśa, an ancient Prakrit grammar, "Prākṛtam is the prakṛti (source) - and the language that Sanskrit originates, or comes from, that prakṛti, is therefore called prākṛtam."
 Hemacandra (a Jain grammarian of the 10th century who lived in Gujarat) in his grammar of Sanskrit and Prākrit named Siddha-Hema-Śabdanuśāsana, defines prākṛt's origin to be sanskṛt: "prakṛtiḥ saṃskṛtam, tatrabhavaṃ tata āgataṃ vā prākṛtaṃ"[Sanskrit is the prakṛti (source) - and Prākṛta is so called because it either 'originates-in' or 'comes-from' Sanskrit.]
 Another prākṛt grammarian, Mārkaṇḍeya, writes in his grammar Prākṛtasarvasva - "prakṛtiḥ saṃskṛtaṃ, tatrabhavaṃ prākṛtam ucyate“ [Sanskrit is called the prakṛti (origin), and from there prākṛtam originates].
 Dhanika, in his 'Daśarūpakāvaloka' commentary on Daśarūpaka (one of the most important treatises explaining the 10 types of Indian Drama), says: "prakṛter āgataṃ prākṛtam, prakṛtiḥ saṃskṛtam" [from the prakṛti (source) comes prākṛtam, and that prakṛti is Sanskrit]
 Siṃhadevagaṇin while commenting on Vāgbhaṭālaṅkāra writes: "prakṛteḥ saṃskrtād āgataṃ prākṛtam" [from Sanskrit (which is the source i.e. Prakṛti) - comes Prākṛt]
 The Prākṛtacandrikā (a grammar of Prākṛt) says: "prakṛtiḥ saṃskṛtaṃ, tatrabhavatvāt prākṛtaṃ smṛtam" [Sanskrit is the prakṛti, it is remembered that prākṛtam originates from that (prakṛti)]
 The Prākṛtaśabdapradīpikā of Narasiṃha says: "prakṛteḥ saṃskṛtāyāstu vikṛtiḥ prākṛtī matā" [Alterations/changes (vikṛti) of the original Sanskrit - is known as Prākṛt]
 The Ṣaḍbhāṣācandrikā of Lakṣmīdhara says the same thing as the above: "prakṛteḥ saṃskṛtāyāstu vikṛtiḥ prākṛtī matā" [Alterations/changes (vikṛti) of the original Sanskrit - is known as Prākṛt]
 Vāsudeva, in his Prākṛtasaṃjīvanī commentary on Rājaśekhara's Karpūramañjarī says: "prākṛtasya tu sarvameva saṃskṛtaṃ yoniḥ" [Sanskrit is the mother of all Prākṛt]
 Nārāyaṇa, in his Rasika-sarvasva commentary on the Gītāgovindam of Jayadeva, says: "saṃskṛtāt prākṛtam iṣṭaṃ tato 'pabhraṃśabhāṣaṇam" [From Sanskrit is derived proper prākṛt, and from that is derived the corrupt-speech i.e. apabhraṃśa]
 Śaṅkara, in his Rasacandrikā commentary on the Abhijñānaśākuntala (play by Kālidāsa) says something slightly different from the above: "saṃskṛtāt prākṛtam śreṣṭhaṃ tato 'pabhraṃśabhāṣaṇam" [From Sanskrit is derived best prākṛt, and from that is derived the corrupt-speech i.e. apabhraṃśa]

Definition 

Modern scholars have used the term "Prakrit" to refer to two concepts:

Prakrit languages: a group of closely related literary languages
 the Prakrit language: one of the Prakrit languages, which alone was used as the primary language of entire poems

Some modern scholars include all Middle Indo-Aryan languages under the rubric of 'Prakrits', while others emphasize the independent development of these languages, often separated from the history of Sanskrit by wide divisions of caste, religion, and geography.

The broadest definition uses the term "Prakrit" to describe any Middle Indo-Aryan language that deviates from Sanskrit in any manner. American scholar Andrew Ollett points out that this unsatisfactory definition makes "Prakrit" a cover term for languages that were not actually called Prakrit in ancient India, such as:

 Ashokan Prakrit: the language of Ashoka's inscriptions
 the language of later inscriptions of India, labeled "Monumental Prakrit", "Lena Prakrit", or "Stupa dialect"
 the language of inscriptions of Sri Lanka, labeled "Sinhalese Prakrit"
 Pali, the language of the Theravada Buddhist canon
 the Buddhist Hybrid Sanskrit
 Gandhari, the language of birch-bark scrolls discovered in the region stretching from northwestern Pakistan to western China.

According to some scholars, such as German Indologists Richard Pischel and Oskar von Hinüber, the term "Prakrit" refers to a smaller set of languages that were used exclusively in literature:

 Scenic Prakrits
 These languages are used exclusively in plays, as secondary languages
 Their names indicate regional association (e.g. Shauraseni, Magadhi, and Avanti), although these associations are mostly notional
 Primary Prakrits
 These languages are used as primary languages of literary classics such as Gaha Sattasai
 This includes the Maharashtri Prakrit or "Prakrit par excellence", which according to Dandin's Kavya-darsha, was prevalent in the Maharashtra region, and in which poems such as Ravana-vaho (or Setubandha) were composed.

According to Sanskrit and Prakrit scholar Sh. Shreyansh Kumar Jain Shastri and A. C. Woolner, the Ardhamagadhi (or simply Magadhi) Prakrit, which was used extensively to write the scriptures of Jainism, is often considered to be the definitive form of Prakrit, while others are considered variants of it. Prakrit grammarians would give the full grammar of Ardhamagadhi first, and then define the other grammars with relation to it. For this reason, courses teaching 'Prakrit' are often regarded as teaching Ardhamagadhi.

Grammar 

Medieval grammarians such as Markandeya (late 16th century) describe a highly systematized Prakrit grammar, but the surviving Prakrit texts do not adhere to this grammar. For example, according to Vishvanatha (14th century), in a Sanskrit drama, the characters should speak Maharashtri Prakrit in verse and Shauraseni Prakrit in prose. But the 10th century Sanskrit dramatist Rajashekhara does not abide by this rule. Markandeya, as well as later scholars such as Sten Konow, find faults with the Prakrit portions of Rajashekhara's writings, but it is not clear if the rule enunciated by Vishvanatha existed during Rajashekhara's time. Rajashekhara himself imagines Prakrit as a single language or a single kind of language, alongside Sanskrit, Apabhramsha, and Paishachi.

German Indologist Theodor Bloch (1894) dismissed the medieval Prakrit grammarians as unreliable, arguing that they were not qualified to describe the language of the texts composed centuries before them. Other scholars such as Sten Konow, Richard Pischel and Alfred Hillebrandt disagree with Bloch. It is possible that the grammarians sought to codify only the language of the earliest classics of the Prakrit literature, such as the Gaha Sattasai. Another explanation is that the extant Prakrit manuscripts contain scribal errors. Most of the surviving Prakrit manuscripts were produced in a variety of regional scripts during 1300–1800 CE. It appears that the scribes who made these copies from the earlier manuscripts did not have a good command of the original language of the texts, as several of the extant Prakrit texts contain inaccuracies or are incomprehensible.

Also, like Sanskrit and other ancient languages Prakrit was spoken and written long before grammars were written for it. The Vedas do not follow Panini's Sanskrit grammar which is now the basis for all Sanskrit grammar. Similarly, the Agamas, and texts like Shatkhandagama, do not follow the modern Prakrit grammar.

Prakrita Prakasha, a book attributed to Vararuchi, summarizes various Prakrit languages.

Prevalence 

Prakrit literature was produced across a wide area of South Asia. Outside India, the language was also known in Cambodia and Java.

Prakrit is often wrongly assumed to have been a language (or languages) spoken by the common people, because it is different from Sanskrit, which is the predominant language of the ancient Indian literature. Several modern scholars, such as George Abraham Grierson and Richard Pischel, have asserted that the literary Prakrit does not represent the actual languages spoken by the common people of ancient India. This theory is corroborated by a market scene in Uddyotana's Kuvalaya-mala (779 CE), in which the narrator speaks a few words in 18 different languages: some of these languages sound similar to the languages spoken in modern India; but none of them resemble the language that Uddyotana identifies as "Prakrit" and uses for narration throughout the text.

Literature 

Literary Prakrit was among the main languages of the classical Indian culture. Dandin's Kavya-darsha (c. 700) mentions four kinds of literary languages: Sanskrit, Prakrit, Apabhramsha, and mixed. Bhoja's Sarasvati-Kanthabharana (11th century) lists Prakrit among the few languages suitable for composition of literature. Mirza Khan's Tuhfat al-hind (1676) names Prakrit among the three kinds of literary languages native to India, the other two being Sanskrit and the vernacular languages. It describes Prakrit as a mixture of Sanskrit and vernacular languages, and adds that Prakrit was "mostly employed in the praise of kings, ministers, and chiefs".

During a large period of the first millennium, literary Prakrit was the preferred language for the fictional romance in India. Its use as a language of systematic knowledge was limited, because of Sanskrit's dominance in this area, but nevertheless, Prakrit texts exist on topics such as grammar, lexicography, metrics, alchemy, medicine, divination, and gemology. In addition, the Jains used Prakrit for religious literature, including commentaries on the Jain canonical literature, stories about Jain figures, moral stories, hymns and expositions of Jain doctrine. Prakrit is also the language of some Shaiva tantras and Vaishnava hymns.

Besides being the primary language of several texts, Prakrit also features as the language of low-class men and most women in the Sanskrit stage plays. American scholar Andrew Ollett traces the origin of the Sanskrit Kavya to Prakrit poems.

Some of the texts that identify their language as Prakrit include:

 Hāla's Gaha Sattasai (c. 1st or 2nd century), anthology of single verse poems
 Ananda-vardhana's 	now-lost God of Five Arrows at Play, poem
 Sarvasena's Hari-vijaya (late 4th century), epic
 Pravarasena II's Ravana-vaho (early 5th century), epic
 Palitta's Tarangavati (probably 1st or 2nd century), fictional romance
 Palitta's Rasikaprakāśana or Brilliance of the Connoisseurs
 Vakpati's Gaudavaho (c. 8th century)
 Haribhadra's Samaraditya-charitra (c. 8th century), fictional romance
 Uddyotana's Kuvalaya-mala (779 CE), fictional romance
 Kautuhala's Lilavati or Kouhala's Lilavai (c. 8th century), fictional romance
 Madhuka's Haramekhalā or Hara's Belt (10th century), a compendium covering a wide range of topics, such as casting love spells and treating snakebites
 Jineshvara's Treasury of Gatha-Jewels (1194), anthology of verses
 Addahamana's Sandesha-rasaka (13th century), a message poem; the author states that his family came from "the land of the Muslims", which suggests that Addahamana is the Prakrit variant of 'Abd ur-Rahman.

List of Prakrits

The languages that have been labeled "Prakrit" in modern times include the following:

Not all of these languages were actually called "Prakrit" in the ancient period.

Dramatic Prakrits

Dramatic Prakrits were those that were used in dramas and other literature.  Whenever dialogue was written in a Prakrit, the reader would also be provided with a Sanskrit translation.

The phrase "Dramatic Prakrits" often refers to three most prominent of them: Shauraseni Prakrit, Magadhi Prakrit, and Maharashtri Prakrit. However, there were a slew of other less commonly used Prakrits that also fall into this category. These include Prachya, Bahliki, Dakshinatya, Shakari, Chandali, Shabari, Abhiri, Dramili, and Odri. There was a strict structure to the use of these different Prakrits in dramas.  Characters each spoke a different Prakrit based on their role and background; for example, Dramili was the language of "forest-dwellers", Sauraseni was spoken by "the heroine and her female friends", and Avanti was spoken by "cheats and rogues". Maharashtri and Shaurseni Prakrit were more common and were used in literature extensively.

Jain Prakrit 

Some 19th-20th century European scholars, such as Hermann Jacobi and Ernst Leumann, made a distinction between Jain and non-Jain Prakrit literature. Jacobi used the term "Jain Prakrit" (or "Jain Maharashtri", as he called it) to denote the language of relatively late and relatively more Sanskrit-influenced narrative literature, as opposed to the earlier Prakrit court poetry. Later scholars used the term "Jain Prakrit" for any variety of Prakrit used by Jain authors, including the one used in early texts such as Tarangavati and Vasudeva-Hindi. However, the works written by Jain authors do not necessarily belong to an exclusively Jain history, and do not show any specific literary features resulting from their belief in Jainism. Therefore, the division of Prakrit literature into Jain and non-Jain categories is no longer considered tenable.

Status 

Prakrit languages are said to have held a lower social status than Sanskrit in classical India. In the Sanskrit stage plays, such as Kalidasa's Shakuntala, lead characters typically speak Sanskrit, while the unimportant characters and most female characters typically speak Prakrit.

While Prakrits were originally seen as 'lower' forms of language, the influence they had on Sanskrit - allowing it to be more easily used by the common people - as well as the converse influence of Sanskrit on the Prakrits, gave Prakrits progressively higher cultural prestige.

Mirza Khan's Tuhfat al-hind (1676) characterizes Prakrit as the language of "the lowest of the low", stating that the language was known as Patal-bani ("Language of the underground") or Nag-bani ("Language of the snakes").

Among modern scholars, Prakrit literature has received less attention than Sanskrit. Few modern Prakrit texts have survived in modern times, and even fewer have been published or attracted critical scholarship. Prakrit has not been designated as a classical language by the Government of India, although the earliest Prakrit texts are older than literature of most of the languages designated as such. One of the reasons behind this neglect of Prakrit is that it is not tied to a regional, national, ethnic, or religious identity.

Research institutes 

In 1955, government of Bihar established at Vaishali, the Research Institute of Prakrit Jainology and Ahimsa with the aim to promote research work in Prakrit.

The National Institute of Prakrit Study and Research is located in Shravanabelagola, Karnataka, India.

References

Bibliography

Further reading 

 

Indo-Aryan languages
Languages of India
Languages attested from the 3rd century BC
Formal languages used for Indian scriptures